Feminism in the Caribbean refers to the collection of movements and ideologies aimed at defining, establishing, and defending a state of equal political, economic, cultural, and social rights for women in the Caribbean.

History 
At the onset of Atlantic Slave Trade, black male labor was largely favored to that of black female labor. Eventually, though, the notion of women as indentured servants was introduced as a means to maximize economic profitability. This meant that, historically, females were valued largely for their reproductive capabilities which was thought to be an integral part of plantation sustainability. The slave trade and indentured servitude launched the racial and gendered institutional struggles that women would face for times to come. Following 1838, the post-emancipation period offered a time in which a number of Indian indentured servants were introduced to the Caribbean. The influx inadvertently offset the ratio between indentured women and men, and, as a result, increased the desire for the incorporation of women into the bodies of servitude. These longterm struggles ultimately forged the way for the female revolutions and radical movements to come. The 1970s marked a time in which the feminist movement really gained traction. The following decade included a number of attempts at inter-regionally building transitional feminist networks that spread geographically between Latin America and the Caribbean. This platform was founded and established by young, leftist generations. Immediately following the devastation that resulted from the Cold War, the 1990s marked a period in which the feminist movement shifted focus toward female perspectives on political matters such as globalization, environmental crises and development. In 1995, the Fourth World Conference on Women signaled significant mobilization for the Caribbean feminist movement. This platform functioned as a means to take advantage of national representation and regional collaboration. Since then, the feminist movement has experienced friction in regards to the debate over whether or not feminist organizing should shift toward more professional nongovernment organizations (NGOs). The shift threatens the prevalence of small, identity-based social movement organizations and has thus sparked controversy among feminist players, specifically leftist feminist networks.

The Agenda of the Feminist Movement 
Ambiguity regarding the term "feminism" has created difficulties for the Caribbean Feminist Movement. Some feminists argue that it is necessary that the movement confront the skewed hierarchy which continues to exist and shape the relations between men and women, and as a result, women's status and access to goods and resources within society. Thus, the movement continues to focus on the "interrogation of masculinity and the bargaining with the tendencies of the patriarchy."

In summary, the feminist agenda, as it applies in the twenty-first century, comprises a mission to expose more concretely the socioeconomic flaws within the patriarchal system. Specifically, that "patriarchal privilege costs both men and society a heavy price, and that there are alternative and more fruitful ways of organizing the sexual division of labour, of managing households and families, of ruling societies and shaping welfare policies, and of structuring the global political economy such that the arguments between ethnic or radicalized groups, different class and sexes, are not resolved through violence and warfare."

Key Determinants 
The movement depends largely on the overall extent to which young men and women feel the prevalence of gender inequality. Once this reality can be recognized, it is then a matter of how compelled the subjects are to combat the issue. Finally, the movement will continue to depend on the democratic freedoms available to ultimately transform this struggle.

In addition, the media has played an integral role in the feminist movement. The significance that accompanies the portrayal of women within the media lies in the fact that media contributes to the overall shaping of societal ways of thinking. The advertising industry maintains tremendous power. Since investment in media has grown exponentially, a representative depiction of women will be crucial to the future of the feminist movement.

Prominent Caribbean Feminists 

 Professor Patricia Mohammed "has been involved in feminist activism and scholarship for over two decades...Her academic publications include Gender in Caribbean Development, (co-edited with Catherine Shepherd), 1988, Rethinking Caribbean Difference, Guest Editor, Special Issue, Feminist Review, Routledge Journals, Summer 1998, Caribbean Women at the Crossroads, co-author with Althea Perkins, University of the West Indies, Kingston, 2002, along with numerous essays in journals and books, magazines and newspapers."

References 

Caribbean
Caribbean culture